Thomas Snodham was an English printer.  He was a specialist music printer, but music accounted for as little as 10 per cent of the books he printed. His other output included plays.

Early life
Snodham was the son of a draper.
In 1595 he was apprenticed to his uncle, the printer Thomas East.  East had started as a general printer, but specialised in music printing after acquiring music type from a deceased printer. He printed works by well-known composers such as William Byrd and John Dowland.

Printing career
Snodham became a freeman of the Stationers Company in 1602. He printed his first book the following year, King James his entertainment at Theobalds, which was sold from East's premises.
When East died in 1608, his will made clear that he wanted Snodham to take over his business, while at the same time he made provision for the financial security of his widow Lucretia.   Snodham acquired East's printing equipment and worked with some of the same composers such as John Wilbye. For a while, the business continued to use the old name; for example, the second set of Wilbye's 'Madrigals' (1609) is stated to be printed by "Thomas East, alias Snodham". Snodham died in 1626.

Snodham and English drama
In 1612, Snodham printed the first edition of Ben Jonson's play The Alchemist, which had been premiered in 1610 by the King's Men.  The following year he printed the second quarto of Thomas Lord Cromwell.

References

1626 deaths
English printers
Music printers
17th-century printers